Word Power is the debut album by American rapper and producer Divine Styler. It was released on October 23, 1989 on Ice-T's  Records under Epic Records. The album peaked at No. 62 on the Billboard Top R&B/Hip-Hop Albums chart. The Scheme Team, a hip hop collective of Divine Styler, made their introduction on the record. 

On this album, Divine rhymed about being proud of heritage (highlighted on "It's a Black Thing") and featured audio production handled by Bilal Bashir (who made later instrumentals for the likes of Everlast, Dr. Dre, and Ice Cube), who later re-released this album in instrumental form in 2005. The album produced the only lead single "Ain't Sayin' Nothin", featuring a scratch noise similar to the sound used in "Jump Around" and "Insane in the Brain". It peaked at No. 10 on the Billboard Hot Rap Songs chart.

Track listing

Samples
"Introduction" sampled "Long Hot Summer Night" by Jimi Hendrix (1968) and "Sign of the Times" by Bob James (1981)
"Freestyler" sampled "Talkin' Loud and Sayin' Nothing" by James Brown (1972) and "I Know You Got Soul" by Bobby Byrd (1971)
"Get Up on It" sampled "Get Up, Get into It, Get Involved" by James Brown (1970), "Push It" by Salt-N-Pepa (1986) and "Soul Power 74" by Maceo Parker (1974)
"The Last Black House on the Left" sampled "Shut Up" by Moonfou (1987)
"It's a Black Thing" sampled "Pot Belly" by Lou Donaldson (1970), "Say It Loud – I'm Black and I'm Proud" by James Brown (1968) and "Good Old Music" by Funkadelic (1970)
"Play It for Divine" sampled "Star Wars Theme/Cantina Band" by Meco Monardo (1977), "Shorty Rides Again" by Eddie Harris & Les McCann (1971), "Scorpio" by Dennis Coffey & the Detroit Guitar Band (1971), "It's a New Day" by James Brown (1970) and "Get on the Good Foot" by James Brown (1972)
"Koxistin U4ria" sampled "I Can't Stop" by John Davis and the Monster Orchestra (1976)
"Ain't Sayin' Nothin" sampled "Shoot Your Shot" by Jr. Walker & the All Stars (1965), "Talkin' Loud and Sayin' Nothing" by James Brown (1972), "Shack Up" by Banbarra (1975), "If You Don't Get It the First Time, Back Up & Try It Again, Parrty" by Fred Wesley & the J.B.'s (1974) and "Nuthin'" by Doug E. Fresh & the Get Fresh Crew (1986)
"Divinity Stylistics" sampled "Superfly" by Curtis Mayfield (1972)
"Tongue of Labyrinth" sampled "Din Daa Daa (Trommeltanz)" by George Kranz (1983) and "UFO" by ESG (1981)
"Rain" sampled "Skylarking (Studio One Version)" by Horace Andy (1969) and "Ring the Alarm" by Tenor Saw (1985)
"Word Power" sampled "What's Going On" by Marvin Gaye (1971)

Personnel
Bilal Bashir – producer, scratches
Lawrence A. Duhart – co-producer, recording, mixing
Glen E. Friedman – photography
Jorge Hinojosa – management
Tracy Lauren Marrow – executive producer
Robert Joseph Pfeifer – executive producer
Mark Richardson – main artist, producer
Tony Sellari – design, art direction
Otis Olivier Lyjasu Williams – featured artist (tracks 11-12)

References

External links
Discogs page.
A blog on the album, includes two songs from the album.

1989 debut albums
Divine Styler albums
Epic Records albums